The 2020–21 Armenian Premier League season is the 29th since its establishment.

Season events
On 30 July, it was announced that FC Van had been giving a license to compete in the Armenian Premier League, with the season commencing on 14 August 2020.

On 29 September, the season was suspended indefinitely due to the escalating 2020 Nagorno-Karabakh war. On 13 October, the FFA announced that the season would resume on 17 October.

On 3 November, Gandzasar Kapan announced that they were withdrawing from the League and Armenian Cup due to the ongoing financial constraints relating to the ongoing COVID-19 pandemic in Armenia and the 2020 Nagorno-Karabakh war.

On 16 March, Lori walked off at the start of their match against Ararat Yerevan in protest of their Matchday 1 fixture being awarded to Urartu after Lori where unable to field a team due to COVID-19. Lori later submitted their resignation from the Premier League on 5 April.

Teams

 1Gandzasar will play their home games at the Yerevan Football Academy Stadium in Yerevan, due to the rebuilding of their regular venue Gandzasar Stadium, Kapan.
 2Lori will play at the main training pitch of the Vanadzor Football Academy due to the rebuilding of their regular venue Vanadzor City Stadium, Vanadzor.
 3Noah will play at the Alashkert Stadium, Yerevan, instead of their regular venue Mika Stadium, Yerevan.

Personnel and sponsorship

Managerial changes

League table

Fixtures and results

Round 1–18

Round 19–27

Season statistics

Scoring
 First goal of the season: Wilfried Eza for Van against Gandzasar Kapan

Top scorers

Clean sheets

References

External links
 
 UEFA

Armenian Premier League seasons
Arm
1